Fifteen is the fourth full-length studio album by American rock band Green River Ordinance, released on January 22, 2016, through Residence Music. The album marks the band's fifteenth year together and is the reason behind its title. It was recorded using analog tape in separate sessions in three cities with producers Paul Moak, Rick Beato and Jordan Critz.

Critical reception

In a four star review in CCM Magazine, Andy Argyrakis describes, "It’s all perfect for a backyard bonfire, front porch swing or intimate gathering amongst close friends, though it’s sure to sound just as sweet pumping out a dashboard radio." In another positive review, Matt Bjorke of Roughstock calls it "a fantastic album."

Track listing
Source: iTunes and ''Fifteens liner notes.

Personnel
Credits adapted from Fifteen'''s liner notes.

Green River Ordinance
 Denton Hunker — drums, percussion
 Geoff Ice — bass, vocals, harmonica
 Jamey Ice — banjo, mandolin, lead guitar, resonator, 12 string electric
 Josh Jenkins — acoustic guitar, lead vocals
 Joshua Wilkerson — electric guitar, vocals, mandolin, piano

Additional musicians
 Ross Holmes — fiddle ("Simple Life")
 Lindsey Duffin — fiddle ("Red Fire Night", "Lucky Ones", "Gold", "Always Love Her", "Endlessly")
 Milo Deering — pedal steel guitar ("Endlessly")
 Chad Copelin — organ ("Endlessly")
 Jordan Critz — electric guitar ("Tallahassee", "You Me & The Sea"), piano ("Tallahassee", "Endlessly"), organ ("Tallahassee", "Endlessly", "You Me & The Sea"), lap steel guitar ("You Me & The Sea"), background vocals ("Always Love Her", "Simple Life", "Keep My Heart Open", "Keep Your Cool", "Life In The Wind", "Maybe It's Time")
 Paul Moak — electric guitar ("Keep Your Cool"), organ ("Keep My Heart Open", "Keep Your Cool", "Maybe It's Time"), slide guitar ("Life In The Wind"), keyboard ("Life In The Wind", "Keep My Heart Open"), pedal steel guitar ("Simple Life")
 Rick Beato — piano, organ ("Red Fire Night", "Only God Knows")

Technical personnel
 Jordan Critz — production ("Tallahassee", "You Me & The Sea", "Endlessly"), engineer ("Tallahassee", "You Me & The Sea", "Endlessly")
 Paul Moak — production ("Always Love Her", "Simple Life", "Keep My Heart Open", "Keep Your Cool", "Life In The Wind", "Maybe It's Time")
 Rick Beato — production ("Red Fire Night", "Only God Knows")
 Ken "GL" Lanyon — engineer ("Red Fire Night", "Only God Knows")
 Devin Vaughan — engineer ("Always Love Her", "Simple Life", "Keep My Heart Open", "Keep Your Cool", "Life In The Wind", "Maybe It's Time")
 Todd Robbins — mixing
 Brad Blackwood — mastering
 Shaun Menary — photography
 Stereotonic — design & layout

Commercial performanceFifteen debuted at number 103 on the US Billboard 200 and number one on Billboards Folk Albums chart, selling 5,100 copies in its first week of release.

Charts

Release history

References

2016 albums
Green River Ordinance (band) albums